Italy competed at the 1998 European Athletics Championships in Budapest, Hungary, from 18 to 23 August 1998.

Medalists

See also
 Italy national athletics team

References

External links
 EAA official site 

 

Italy at the European Athletics Championships
Nations at the 1998 European Athletics Championships
1998 in Italian sport